A low-FODMAP diet is a person's global restriction of consumption of all fermentable carbohydrates (FODMAPs), recommended only for a short time. A low-FODMAP diet is recommended for managing patients with irritable bowel syndrome (IBS) and can reduce digestive symptoms of IBS including bloating and flatulence.

If the problem lies with indigestible fiber instead, the patient may be directed to a low-residue diet.

Effectiveness and risks
A low-FODMAP diet might help to improve short-term digestive symptoms in adults with functional abdominal bloating and irritable bowel syndrome, but its long-term use can have negative effects because it causes a detrimental impact on the gut microbiota and metabolome. It should only be used for short periods of time and under the advice of a specialist. More studies are needed to evaluate its effectiveness in children with irritable bowel syndrome.
There is only a little evidence of its effectiveness in treating functional symptoms in inflammatory bowel disease from small studies that are susceptible to bias. More studies are needed to assess the true impact of this diet on health.

In addition, the use of a low-FODMAP diet without medical advice can lead to serious health risks, including nutritional deficiencies and misdiagnosis, so it is advisable to conduct a complete medical evaluation before starting a low-FODMAP diet to ensure a correct diagnosis and that the appropriate therapy may be undertaken.

Since the consumption of gluten is suppressed or reduced with a low-FODMAP diet, the improvement of the digestive symptoms with this diet may not be related to the withdrawal of the FODMAPs, but of gluten, indicating the presence of an unrecognized celiac disease, avoiding its diagnosis and correct treatment, with the consequent risk of several serious health complications, including various types of cancer.

A low-FODMAP diet is highly restrictive in various groups of nutrients, can be impractical to follow in the long-term and may add an unnecessary financial burden.

Suggested foods
Below are low-FODMAP foods categorized by group according to the Monash University "Low-FODMAP Diet".
 Vegetables: alfalfa, bean sprouts, green beans, bok choy, capsicum (bell pepper), carrot, chives, fresh herbs, choy sum, cucumber, lettuce, tomato, zucchini, the green parts of leeks and spring onions
 Fruits: orange, grapes, honeydew melon (not watermelon)
 Protein: meats, fish, chicken, eggs, tofu (not silken), tempeh
 Dairy: lactose-free milk, lactose-free yoghurts, hard cheese
 Breads and cereals: rice, crisped rice, maize or corn, potatoes, quinoa, and breads made with their flours alone; however, oats and spelt are relatively low in FODMAPs
 Biscuits (cookies) and snacks: made with flour of cereals listed above, without high FODMAP ingredients added (such as onion, pear, honey, or polyol artificial sweeteners)
 Nuts and seeds: almonds (no more than ten nuts per serving), pumpkin seeds; not cashews or pistachios
 Beverage options: water, coffee, tea
Other sources confirm the suitability of these and suggest some additional foods.

History 
The basis of many functional gastrointestinal disorders (FGIDs) is distension of the intestinal lumen. Such luminal distension may induce pain, a sensation of bloating, abdominal distension and motility disorders. Therapeutic approaches seek to reduce factors that lead to distension, particularly of the distal small and proximal large intestine. Food substances that can induce distension are those that are poorly absorbed in the proximal small intestine, osmotically active, and fermented by intestinal bacteria with hydrogen (as opposed to methane) production. The small molecule FODMAPs exhibit these characteristics.

Over many years, there have been multiple observations that ingestion of certain short-chain carbohydrates, including lactose, fructose and sorbitol, fructans and galactooligosaccharides, can induce gastrointestinal discomfort similar to that of people with irritable bowel syndrome. These studies also showed that dietary restriction of short-chain carbohydrates was associated with symptoms improvement.

These short-chain carbohydrates (lactose, fructose and sorbitol, fructans and GOS) behave similarly in the intestine. Firstly, being small molecules and either poorly absorbed or not absorbed at all, they drag water into the intestine via osmosis. Secondly, these molecules are readily fermented by colonic bacteria, so upon malabsorption in the small intestine they enter the large intestine where they generate gases (hydrogen, carbon dioxide and methane). The dual actions of these carbohydrates cause an expansion in volume of intestinal contents, which stretches the intestinal wall and stimulates nerves in the gut.  It is this 'stretching' that triggers the sensations of pain and discomfort that are commonly experienced by people with IBS.

The FODMAP concept was first published in 2005 as part of a hypothesis paper. In this paper, it was proposed that a collective reduction in the dietary intake of all indigestible or slowly absorbed, short-chain carbohydrates would minimise stretching of the intestinal wall. This was proposed to reduce stimulation of the gut's nervous system and provide the best chance of reducing symptom generation in people with IBS (see below). At the time, there was no collective term for indigestible or slowly absorbed, short-chain carbohydrates, so the term 'FODMAP' was created to improve understanding and facilitate communication of the concept.

The low FODMAP diet was originally developed by a research team at Monash University in Melbourne, Australia. The Monash team undertook the first research to investigate whether a low FODMAP diet improved symptom control in patients with IBS and established the mechanism by which the diet exerted its effect. Monash University also established a rigorous food analysis program to measure the FODMAP content of a wide selection of Australian and international foods. The FODMAP composition data generated by Monash University updated previous data that was based on limited literature, with guesses (sometimes wrong) made where there was little information.

References

External links
 A Beginner's Guide to the Low-FODMAP Diet at Healthline

Diets
Gastroenterology
Carbohydrates